Marne Bhi Do Yaaron is a Hindi movie directed by Kashmera Shah and released on 15 November 2019.

Plot
Raj Kiran, an ambitious young man, wishes to work overseas and make a life for himself there. With the help of some agents and most of his father's life-savings, he manages to acquire a visa to Greece but falls prey to their trap as his visa is just a tourist visa on which he cannot work. Now, devastated Raj decides to commit suicide. As he gets started on his suicide attempts, he cannot get himself to commit the suicide. Then, he meets Anita, a bystander who watches him during one of his suicide attempts. Seeing Raj fail, Anita offers to help him to commit suicide for money to which he agrees. Their out of the world alliance brings on a journey of bizarre suicides attempts and madness.

Cast
 Krushna Abhishek as Samay / Time
 Kashmera Shah as AnitaRaj
 Rishaab Chauhaan as Raj Kiran
 Kishwer Merchant as Sunny
 Pawan Singh as Honey
 Lalit Bhardwaj as Lalit
 Vinod Gaikar as JD
 Kiran Kumar as RajKiran's Father
 Rajesh Puri as Dharam - Hotel Manager

Reception
Pallabi Dey Purkayastha of Times of India called the screenplay "haphazard from the very first frame that goes on to prove that this comedy flick lacks the sharpness of a seasoned storyteller".

References

External links
 
 

2010s Hindi-language films
Cross-dressing in Indian films
2019 films